The Pakistan women's cricket team toured Zimbabwe to play against the Zimbabwe women's cricket team in February 2021. The tour was scheduled to consist of three 50-over matches and three Women's Twenty20 Internationals (WT20Is). The tour immediately followed Pakistan's tour of South Africa. Zimbabwe's last international fixtures were in May 2019, in the 2019 ICC Women's Qualifier Africa tournament. In late January 2021, Zimbabwe's Sports and Recreation Commission gave its approval for the tour to take place.

At the time of the tour, Zimbabwe did not have Women's One Day International (WODI) status, so the 50-over matches were not classed as such. Ahead of the tour Zimbabwe's coach, Adam Chifo, said that one of the aims would be for the team to eventually gain WODI status. On 5 February 2021, the Pakistan team arrived in Harare for their first ever tour of the country.

Pakistan won the first 50-over match, beating Zimbabwe by 178 runs. However, on 11 February 2021, the tour was ended abruptly. Commencing on 13 February 2021, Emirates Airlines introduced new travel policies on flights from Harare to Pakistan, resulting in the Pakistan team flying home ahead of the new restrictions.

Squads

50-over series

1st 50-over match

2nd 50-over match

3rd 50-over match

WT20I series

1st WT20I

2nd WT20I

3rd WT20I

References

External links
 Series home at ESPN Cricinfo

Zimbabwe 2020-21
International cricket competitions in 2020–21
2021 in women's cricket
Cricket events curtailed due to the COVID-19 pandemic
2021 in Pakistani women's sport